Mlaka is a settlement in the Municipality of Komenda in the Upper Carniola region of Slovenia.

References

External links

Mlaka on Geopedia

Populated places in the Municipality of Komenda